The 2017 Sudamérica Rugby Sevens was the eleventh edition of the Sudamérica Rugby Sevens, the continental championship for rugby sevens in South America. One team qualified for the tournament through the SAR North Sevens.

Chile and Uruguay — as the top two finishing teams that are not already core teams on the Sevens World Series — qualified to the 2017 Hong Kong Sevens for a chance to earn core team status. Chile — as the top finishing non core team — qualified for the 2017 USA Sevens.

Qualifying

Lower-ranked teams qualified through the Sudamérica Rugby North Sevens tournament, held in Guarne-Antioquia, Colombia from 8–9 July 2016

Group stage

Group A

Group B

Group C

Knockout round

Semi-Finals

Seventh Place Playoff

Fifth Place Playoff

Third Place Playoff

Final

Final standings

Main Tournament

The main South America Sevens series will take place over two legs, one in Punta del Este, Uruguay, and one in Viña del Mar, Chile.

Unlike the other continental sevens championships, the South American Sevens invites countries from outside South America to participate. Fiji, United States, and Canada sent developmental teams.

Punta del Este Sevens

The Punta del Este Sevens was held at Campus de Maldonado, 6–7 January 2017

Group A

Group B

Knockout Stage

Cup

{{Round8-with third

|17:30 Jan 7
|  | 19 |  | 12
|17:50 Jan 7
|  | 26 |  Maple Leafs | 5
|18:10 Jan 7
|  Falcons | 14 |  | 12
|18:30 Jan 7
|  | 31 |  | 0

|
|  | 0 |  | 29|
|  Falcons | 0 |  | 43|
|  | 22 |  | 21

|
|  | 19' |  Falcons | 7
}}PlatePlate''

Final standings

References

2017 rugby sevens competitions
2017 in South American rugby union
Rugby sevens competitions in South America
International rugby union competitions hosted by Colombia
International rugby union competitions hosted by Chile
International rugby union competitions hosted by Uruguay
Punta Del Este Sevens
2017 in Colombian sport
2017 in Chilean sport
2017 in Uruguayan sport
January 2017 sports events in South America